Direct access may refer to:
DirectAccess, a network technology in Windows 7 and Windows Server 2008 R2, and Windows 8 and Windows Server 2012
Direct access (computing), a concept in computer science
Direct Access Archive, a proprietary file format
Direct access storage device, a secondary computer storage device
Direct Access Test Unit, special numbers used to test telephone exchanges
Direct access trading, a technology for stock trading